Martyn Jones is a politician.

Martyn Jones may also refer to:

Martyn Jones (painter) (born 1955), British painter
Martyn Jones, member of The Mermen rock band

See also
Martyn Lloyd-Jones (1899–1981), Welsh Protestant minister
Martin Jones (disambiguation)